Alexandra Bozovic (born 15 February 1999) is a professional Australian tennis player.

Bozovic has a career-high singles ranking by the Women's Tennis Association (WTA) of No. 305, and a career-high WTA doubles ranking of 223, both achieved on 12 December 2022.

Bozovic made her Grand Slam main-draw debut after winning the 2020 Australian Open Wildcard Playoff, granting her a wildcard into the 2020 Australian Open women's doubles event alongside Amber Marshall.

Career
In January 2022, Bozovic lost in the first round of the Australian Open qualifying.

Grand Slam performance timeline

Singles

Doubles

ITF finals

Singles: 5 (2 titles, 3 runner–ups)

Doubles: 10 (5 titles, 5 runner–ups)

Notes

References

External links
 
 
 

1999 births
Living people
Australian female tennis players
Tennis players from Sydney